The 2017 Melbourne Football Club season was the club's 118th year in the VFL/AFL since it began in 1897.

Senior personnel
Simon Goodwin entered his first season as senior coach after taking over from departed coach, Paul Roos, as part of the succession plan. A restructure in the player development area saw the head of development, Brett Allison leave the club with the club electing not to renew his contract; former  player and  assistant coach, Matthew Egan was hired in September 2016 as the replacement for Allison. Former  and  player, Troy Chaplin joined the club in a newly created role, the offensive coordinator, in his first year as an assistant coach after he retired during the 2016 season. The club secured two-time Geelong premiership player and former Geelong and  development coach, Max Rooke as a development coach in November 2016. Glen Bartlett will continue in his role as club president, a role he has held since August 2013. Chief Executive Officer, Peter Jackson, will continue with the club after signing a contract extension to the end of the 2018 season.

Fixture summary
After having a home game at Etihad Stadium every season since 2011, the club didn't have to play a home match at Etihad in 2017, which drew pleasure from both the club and fans alike. The team played its first seven matches in Victoria and then travelled to Adelaide to play  at Adelaide Oval in round eight; the final three matches of the season were played at the Melbourne Cricket Ground against non-finalists in 2016. The club again hosted  in the annual Queen's Birthday clash in round twelve and played  in the Anzac Day eve match in round five; due to an ongoing sponsorship with Tourism NT, the club hosted two matches in the Northern Territory, the first was against  at TIO Traeger Park in round ten and the second was at TIO Stadium against  in round seventeen. The club played its first Friday night match since the 2015 season and the second in total since the 2012 season, when they hosted  at the Melbourne Cricket Ground in round fifteen. The club had the equal-most six day breaks with eight in total, including two back-to-back from rounds thirteen to fifteen.

In addition to the Friday night match, the club played eleven Saturday matches (five afternoons, three twilights, and three nights), eight Sunday matches (all afternoon matches) and two Monday matches (one afternoon and one night). Nine matches were broadcast on free-to-air on the Seven Network and thirteen were broadcast on pay TV on Fox Footy. With the off-season recruitment of  player, Jordan Lewis, both AFL Media and the Herald Sun noted the round seven match against Hawthorn as the "match to watch" for Melbourne's season. Analysis by Champion Data ranked the fixture difficulty as the eighth hardest out of the eighteen teams.

2017 list changes

2016 trades

Retirements and delistings

National draft

Rookie draft

2017 squad

2017 season

Pre-season

JLT Community Series

Week 1

Week 2

Week 3

Home and away season

Round 1

Round 2

Round 3

Round 4

Round 5

Round 6

Round 7

Round 8

Round 9

Round 10

Round 11

Round 12

Round 13

Round 14

Round 15

Round 16

Round 17

Round 18

Round 19

Round 20

Round 21

Round 22

Round 23

Ladder

Ladder breakdown by opposition

Tribunal/Match Review Panel cases

Awards

Brownlow Medal tally

Keith 'Bluey' Truscott Medal tally (top 10)

Keith 'Bluey' Truscott Trophy – Clayton Oliver

Sid Anderson Memorial Trophy (second in the best and fairest) – Jack Viney

Ron Barassi Snr Memorial Trophy (third in the best and fairest) – Nathan Jones and Jordan Lewis

Ivor Warne-Smith Memorial Trophy (fourth in the best and fairest) – not awarded

Dick Taylor Memorial Trophy (fifth in the best and fairest) – Neville Jetta

Harold Ball Memorial Trophy (best young player) – Clayton Oliver

Troy Broadbridge Trophy (highest polling MFC player in the Casey best and fairest) – Jack Trengove

Ron Barassi Jnr. Leadership Award – Jack Viney

Ian Ridley Club Ambassador Award – Neville Jetta

Norm Smith Memorial Trophy (coach's award) – Neville Jetta

James McDonald Trophy (best team man) – Clayton Oliver

Leading goalkicker award – Jeff Garlett (42 goals)

Women's team

Fixture

Round 1

Round 2

Round 3

Round 4

Round 5

Round 6

Round 7

Ladder

Tribunal and match review panel cases

References

External links
 Official Website of the Melbourne Football Club
 Official Website of the AFL

2017
Melbourne Football Club
Melbourne